Patrick Berthou (born 17 June 1963) is a French rower. He competed in the men's coxed pair event at the 1992 Summer Olympics.

References

External links
 

1963 births
Living people
French male rowers
Olympic rowers of France
Rowers at the 1992 Summer Olympics
Sportspeople from Meurthe-et-Moselle